Austin James Wilk (born 28 August 1995) is an American professional ice hockey defenseman for the KHL Sisak of the Croatian Ice Hockey League and International Hockey League (IHL). He has previously played for the Victoria Cougars (VIJHL) and Lindenwood University.

Wilk was also a member of the United States men's national ice hockey team for 2017 Winter Universiade and 2019 Winter Universiade.

Awards and honors

References

External links

1995 births
Living people
KHL Sisak players
People from Camarillo, California
Lindenwood University alumni